There were ten elections in 1907 to the United States House of Representatives.  Five were special elections in the 60th United States Congress and the other five were new seats from the new state of Oklahoma. There were no special elections in 1907 during the 61st United States Congress.

Elections are listed first by date, then by district.

Special elections 

|-
! 
| William Alden Smith
|  | Republican
| 1894
|  | Incumbent resigned February 9, 1907, when elected U.S. senator.New member elected April 27, 1907.Republican hold.Successor seated March 17, 1908.
| nowrap | 

|-
! 
| Charles Curtis
|  | Republican
| 1892
|  | Incumbent resigned January 28, 1907, when elected U.S. senator.New member elected May 23, 1907.Republican hold.
| nowrap | 

|-
! 
| John E. Reyburn
|  | Republican
| 1906 
|  | Incumbent resigned March 31, 1907, to become Mayor of Philadelphia.New member elected November 5, 1907.Republican hold.
| nowrap | 

|-
! 
| John F. Rixey
|  | Democratic
| 1896
|  | Incumbent died February 8, 1907.New member elected November 5, 1907.Democratic hold.
| nowrap | 

|-
! 
| Campbell Slemp
|  | Republican
| 1902
|  | Incumbent died October 13, 1907.New member elected November 5, 1907.Republican hold.
| nowrap | 

|}

Oklahoma 

Oklahoma became a state on November 16, 1907, and elected its first five members of the House:

|-
! 
| colspan=3 | None 
|  | New seat.New member elected September 17, 1907.Republican gain.
| nowrap | 

|-
! 
| colspan=3 | None 
|  | New seat.New member elected September 17, 1907.Democratic gain.
| nowrap | 

|-
! 
| colspan=3 | None 
|  | New seat.New member elected September 17, 1907.Democratic gain.
| nowrap | 

|-
! 
| colspan=3 | None 
|  | New seat.New member elected September 17, 1907.Democratic gain.
| nowrap | 

|-
! 
| colspan=3 | None 
|  | New seat.New member elected September 17, 1907.Democratic gain.
| nowrap | 

|}

References 

 
1907